The 1915 Saffron Walden by-election was a parliamentary by-election held for the House of Commons constituency of Saffron Walden in Essex on 13 February 1915.

Vacancy
The by-election was caused by the resignation of the sitting Liberal MP, Cecil Beck. Beck had been appointed a Lord Commissioner of the Treasury, one of the formal titles held by government Whips  and under the Parliamentary rules of the day had to resign and fight a by-election.

Candidates
Beck was re-selected to fight the seat by his local Liberal Association and as the wartime truce between the political parties was in operation   
no opposing candidate was nominated against him.

The result
There being no other candidates putting themselves forward Beck was returned unopposed.

See also
List of United Kingdom by-elections 
United Kingdom by-election records
1901 Saffron Walden by-election
1977 Saffron Walden by-election

References

1915 elections in the United Kingdom
1915 in England
1910s in Essex
February 1915 events
Saffron Walden
By-elections to the Parliament of the United Kingdom in Essex constituencies
Unopposed ministerial by-elections to the Parliament of the United Kingdom (need citation)